Kerria yunnanensis is a species of scale insect found in China. Eleven different species of ants are known to feed on the honeydew K. yunnanensis produces.

References

Kerriidae
Insects of China
Insects described in 1990